Salinivirga cyanobacteriivorans is a species of bacteria that preys on cyanobacteria.

References

Bacteroidia